Fondant is a mixture of sugar and water used as a confection, filling, or icing.

It may also refer to:

 Chocolate fondant, a type of dessert (usually cake)
 Fondant icing, a type of icing commonly used on decorative cakes
 Fondant potatoes, also known as pommes fondant, a method of preparing potatoes
 Honey fondant, creamed honey